Bamford is an affluent suburban area within the Metropolitan Borough of Rochdale, in Greater Manchester, England.

Together with neighbouring Birtle, it formed the civil parish of Birtle-with-Bamford (also known as Birtle-cum-Bamford). It was in Middleton ecclesiastical parish and in Bury poor law Union. In 1933, Birtle-with-Bamford was dissolved with Bamford being amalgamated into the Metropolitan Borough of Rochdale in 1974.

The Bamford ward lies in the Heywood and Middleton constituency represented in the Houses of Parliament. The population of the ward at the 2011 census was 9,693.

References

Areas of Rochdale